The Wanted are a British-Irish boy band.

The Wanted may also refer to:

 The Wanted (album), by the Wanted, 2010
 The Wanted (EP), by the Wanted, 2012

See also
 
 Wanted (disambiguation)